Jerome Assauer (born 6 June 1988) is a retired German footballer who played as a striker.

Career
In late July 2014, Viktoria Köln announced the signing of Assauer on a one-year deal.

References

External links

Profile at kicker.de

1988 births
Living people
German footballers
1. FC Köln II players
SC Paderborn 07 players
SC Preußen Münster players
Wuppertaler SV players
Sportfreunde Lotte players
TuS Koblenz players
FC Viktoria Köln players
2. Bundesliga players
Association football forwards
Footballers from Cologne